The 20 (previously known as the VH1 Top 20 Video Countdown) is a weekly music video countdown television show that aired on the VH1 cable television network in the United States. The long-running show was first introduced in 1995 as VH1 Top 10 Countdown, part of VH1's "Music First" re-branding effort. Over the years, a variety of hosts counted down the top 10 or 20 music videos of the week. The order of countdown was initially decided by a mix of record sales, radio airplay, video spins, message board posts, and conventional mail. The last episode aired unexpectedly without any ceremony on November 28, 2015, along with the last number one on the show belongs to Hotline Bling by the Canadian rapper Drake.

History
As part of VH-1's rebranding as "VH1: Music First" in 1995, the channel launched a new show, the VH1 Top 10 Countdown, that counted down the top 10 music videos played on the channel each week. A combination of record sales, radio airplay, video spins, message board posts, and conventional mail decided the order of the countdown. A rotating cast of VJs picked up hosting duties for the show over the years. The show expanded from 10 to 20 music videos, becoming VH1 Top 20 Video Countdown, in January 2001.

Each week, the show broadcasts from another location around New York City, often at the Virgin Records store in Union Square. Following a decline in the show's relevance, popular Survivor contestant Jenna Lewis was hired to host the show in 2001. After her departure from the show, from 2002 to 2006, the show was usually hosted by either Rachel Perry, Bradford How, or Aamer Haleem, but occasionally another VJ would fill in.

The show became known as the VSPOT Top 20 Video Countdown on April 7, 2006, at which time it received a new on-air look, a new studio at the MTV headquarters in Times Square (where TRL located at), and a new host, Matt Pinfield, the venerable VJ from MTV and MTV2 in the 1990s and former host of MTV's 120 Minutes. In a fundamental change from the show's older format of compiling the top 20 videos of the week, Online votes determined the entire order of the countdown. Fan participation was introduced via VSPOT, VH1's online music video outlet. Also as part of the change, VH1 temporarily moved the show's first airing of the week to Friday evenings instead of Saturday mornings. On the week of July 15, 2006, the show stopped airing on Friday evenings.

On the September 16, 2006, episode, Pinfield announced that after being on the countdown for 20 weeks, a video would be retired. Before this time, videos could remain on the countdown for as long as seemed appropriate, though almost all were gone by the 24th week. One notable exception, however, was Keane's "Somewhere Only We Know", which remained in the countdown for 28 non-consecutive weeks in two countdown runs. The video did not reach the top 10 and its second wind was caused by the popularity of the VH1.com live version of the video.

After Pinfield did not show up for a few recordings of the show on October 7, 2006, former host Aamer Haleem returned to host the show once again. Starting the week of February 17, 2007, after a mass layoff of music producers at MTV Networks (now known as "Paramount Media Networks"), the show left the MTV studios and became broadcast from another location every week, as it was in the late 1990s and early 2000s (decade), starting at New York's Grand Central Terminal. Haleem continued to host the show every week from another location until August 4, 2007, when he hosted his last episode.

Alison Becker became the new host on August 11, 2007. Around this time, the VSPOT online video center was renamed to "Video.VH1.com," so the series regained its original title, VH1 Top 20 Video Countdown. Since then, each episode has usually featured one or two interviews with all celebrities of latest notoriety who either have a video, movie, or TV show of interest at the time. The countdown sometimes has videos high in its countdown despite virtually no radio airplay for the song. One example is Bret Michaels' Go That Far which was directed by Shane Stanley. This video spent twelve weeks on the countdown and bowed out at #7. The video supported Michaels' show Rock of Love which is shown on the network.

David Cook and David Archuleta, the winner and runner-up of American Idol season 7 were the first guest stars to introduce their own music video at the #1 spot. David Archuleta introduced his video "Crush" on November 15, 2008. The following Countdown on November 22, 2008,  Cook made a guest appearance to introduce his music video for "Light On" which was making its Countdown Debut at #1. Shinedown joined the group to introduce a song at #1 when their video for "Second Chance" was #1 on May 16, 2009. Introducing "Come Back To Me" at #1 on May 30, 2009, made David Cook the first to introduce two music videos at #1 on two occasions. Later in 2009 Daughtry introduced their music video for "No Surprise" at #1 on July 18, 2009, and British singer Jay Sean introduced his music video for "Down" at #1 on October 17, 2009. After four months of no one introducing their own video at #1, Adam Lambert would also join the group as he introduced his video, "Whataya Want from Me," at #1 on February 20, 2010. At VH1's Winter Wonderland Countdown Special, The Script introduced their video, Breakeven at #1 on March 6, 2010. For five months, no one had introduced their song at number one until August 21, 2010, where B.o.B introduced Airplanes at #1. Two months later, on October 9,  Bruno Mars introduced his #1 single, "Just the Way You Are," at #1. Following a four- to five-month absence of an artist introduction at #1, on February 26, 2011, Adele introduced "Rolling in the Deep" at #1. On November 5, 2011, Kelly Clarkson introduced "Mr. Know It All" at #1 after a nine-month absence. On March 24, 2012, Neon Hitch introduced "[[Ass Back Home]|Get Yourself Back Home]]" at #1. Since then there has been no one else to introduce their own videos at #1, but it is likely there will be more by looking at past Countdowns where this has occurred.

Becker announced at the end of the January 3, 2009, broadcast that it would be her last show as host. The new host, Jim Shearer, taped his first show on January 5, 2009, at the Virgin Megastore at Union Square in New York, for broadcast on January 10. In 2009, VH1 took tighter control of the songs played on the show, with the number of videos available to be voted onto the Top 20 Countdown reduced to less than 30, and several videos removed from the voting list while they were still in the top half of the Countdown. There are also less rivalries regarding songs that try to earn a #1 spot due to the lack of a majority of song rivalries in 2009 and four consecutive brand new #1 videos in January 2010.

On September 18, 2010, the show had expanded from 2 hours to 2.5 hours, but returned to the original two-hour format on February 11, 2012. On May 14, 2011, the show celebrated its 800th episode. This makes the countdown the longest-running music-related program on any channel, ever, in TV history. The countdown's 800th #1 video was "Rolling in the Deep" from Adele.

In the past we could choose up to 20 videos to vote for at one time by dragging a song into spaces that were numbered 1-20, and it was unlimited to how many times you could vote, but in mid-2011, the voting format changed. It was made to where we could only vote for one video at a time and votes were limited to 20 times per day. As of 2014, the show's voting was taken away. Jim Shearer hosted his last episode on December 13, 2014, since his contract was not renewed for 2015. From January 10, 2015, to April 25, 2015, musical artists and others guest-hosted the show.

On April 12, 2015, Shannon Coffey was announced as the new host starting on May 2, 2015, keeping the same video countdown, but introduced with new segments and the show's name is changed to The 20.

On November 28, 2015, the last episode of "The 20" aired without ceremony, and the program was cancelled without any publicity or statement as to why. An end of year special aired on December 15, 2015 in the same time slot called the 2015 Year-End Special hosted by Coffey, but no video of the year was named, and it comprised a countdown of 20 pop-culture moments instead of videos, From 2016 Paramount has dropped has out music videos from the VH1 schedule. Random movies now air in the show's former timeslot.

Special editions
Occasionally, VH1 aired special editions of the Top 20 Video Countdown:
Fairway to Heaven: The show is condensed to 18 videos and takes place at a celebrity golf tournament. The title is a reference to the song "Stairway to Heaven."
Lift Ticket to Ride: An annual winter ski party event. The title is a reference to the song "Ticket to Ride."
VH1's Top 40 Videos of the Year: The year's best videos are counted down with commentary from celebrities. Prior to 2002, the special was a top 50 countdown, and was five hours long to allow most or all of each video to be played. From 2002–2011, the special was a top 40 countdown and resembled VH1's occasional "Top 100" countdowns. In 2012, the format of the year end show was changed again, to a top 20 countdown. The special is treated the same way as a weekly show would be shown. In 2013, the format changed again back to a top 40 countdown. In 2014, the year end countdown once again changed back to a top 20 format.
Rock Across America: Each summer through 2001, the show became a traveling event across the country.
The 20th Anniversary special aired on June 20, 2015. Starting with 1995, each year was represented with a video.

20/20 Club
A video is said to be part of the 20/20 Club when it has been on the countdown for 20 consecutive weeks. On its 20th week, the host will say that it has reached 20 weeks and this will be the last time it will be shown on the countdown. As of 2013, the 20/20 Club has ended, and there is no limit to how long videos can appear on the countdown.

Videos that spent 20 weeks or more before the 20/20 Club

1995
"Run-Around" - Blues Traveler

1996
"One Sweet Day" - Mariah Carey featuring Boyz II Men
"Because You Loved Me" - Celine Dion

1997
"Bitch" – Meredith Brooks
"You Were Meant for Me" – Jewel
"One Headlight" – The Wallflowers

1998
"I Don't Want to Miss a Thing" – Aerosmith
"My Heart Will Go On" – Celine Dion
"The Way" – Fastball
"Iris" – Goo Goo Dolls
"Torn" – Natalie Imbruglia
"3 a.m." – Matchbox Twenty
"Real World" – Matchbox Twenty
"Truly Madly Deeply" – Savage Garden
"Walking on the Sun" – Smash Mouth

1999
"My Favorite Mistake" – Sheryl Crow
"Save Tonight" – Eagle Eye Cherry
"Hands" – Jewel
"Livin' la Vida Loca" – Ricky Martin
"Kiss Me" – Sixpence None the Richer
"Every Morning" – Sugar Ray
"All Star" – Smash Mouth

2000
"It's My Life" – Bon Jovi
"Smooth" – Santana featuring Rob Thomas
"Kryptonite" – 3 Doors Down
"Everything You Want" – Vertical Horizon

2001
"With Arms Wide Open" – Creed
"Thank You" – Dido
"I'm Like a Bird" – Nelly Furtado
"The Way You Love Me" – Faith Hill
"Superman (It's Not Easy)" – Five For Fighting
"Hanging by a Moment" – Lifehouse
"Again" – Lenny Kravitz
"South Side" – Moby featuring Gwen Stefani
"When It's Over" – Sugar Ray
"It's Been A While" – Staind
"Drops of Jupiter (Tell Me)" – Train
"Beautiful Day" – U2

2002
"One Last Breath" – Creed
"Soak Up the Sun" – Sheryl Crow
"Everyday" – Dave Matthews Band
"Wasting My Time" – Default
"Here is Gone" – Goo Goo Dolls
"Standing Still" – Jewel
"How You Remind Me" – Nickelback
"The Middle" – Jimmy Eat World
"No Such Thing" – John Mayer
"Hella Good" – No Doubt
"Hey Baby" – No Doubt featuring Bounty Killer

2003
"Landslide" – Dixie Chicks
"Bring Me to Life" – Evanescence featuring Paul McCoy
"Unwell" – Matchbox Twenty
"Your Body is a Wonderland" – John Mayer
"Harder to Breathe" – Maroon 5
"The Remedy (I Won't Worry)" – Jason Mraz
"Underneath It All" – No Doubt featuring Lady Saw
"The Game of Love" – Santana featuring Michelle Branch
"Calling All Angels" – Train

2004
"The First Cut Is the Deepest" – Sheryl Crow
"My Immortal" – Evanescence
"The Reason" – Hoobastank
"If I Ain't Got You" – Alicia Keys
"Are You Gonna Be My Girl" – Jet
"This Love" – Maroon 5
"Someday" – Nickelback
"It's My Life" – No Doubt

2005
"I Don't Want to Be" – Gavin DeGraw
"Holiday" – Green Day
"You and Me" – Lifehouse
"Somewhere Only We Know" – Keane
"Mr. Brightside" – The Killers
"Let Me Go – 3 Doors Down

2006
"You're Beautiful" – James Blunt
"Over My Head (Cable Car)" – The Fray
"Photograph" – Nickelback

Videos retired to the 20/20 Club

2006
"Not Ready to Make Nice" – Dixie Chicks
"About Us" – Brooke Hogan ft. Paul Wall
"Far Away" – Nickelback
"Buttons" – The Pussycat Dolls ft. Snoop Dogg

2007
"It Ends Tonight" – The All-American Rejects
"How To Save A Life" – The Fray
"If Everyone Cared" – Nickelback
"U + Ur Hand" – P!nk

2008
"Pocketful of Sunshine" – Natasha Bedingfield
"Feels Like Tonight" – Daughtry
"Whatever It Takes" – Lifehouse
"Better in Time" – Leona Lewis
"I'm Yours" – Jason Mraz

2009
"Gives You Hell" – All-American Rejects
"Lucky" – Jason Mraz and Colbie Caillat
"Stay" – Safetysuit
"Second Chance" – Shinedown

2010
"Halfway Gone" – Lifehouse (Honorary)
"Breakeven" – The Script (Honorary)
"Like You Do" – Angel Taylor

2011
"Rolling in the Deep" – Adele
"Jar of Hearts" – Christina Perri
"For the First Time" – The Script

2012
"Not Over You" – Gavin DeGraw
"Somebody That I Used to Know" – Gotye featuring Kimbra
"Lights" – Ellie Goulding
"Some Nights" – fun.
"Domino" – Jessie J
"Ho Hey" – The Lumineers
"Everybody Talks" – Neon Trees

2013
"I Will Wait" - Mumford & Sons
"It's Time" - Imagine Dragons
"Next to Me" - Emeli Sandé
"Counting Stars" - OneRepublic

2014
"Let Her Go" - Passenger

List of #1's

1994
*Video of the Year: "Come to My Window" – Melissa Etheridge

1995
October 28: "Runaway" - Janet Jackson
November 4: "As I Lay Me Down" – Sophie B. Hawkins
November 11: "As I Lay Me Down" – Sophie B. Hawkins
November 18: "As I Lay Me Down" – Sophie B. Hawkins
Video of the Year: "Let Her Cry" – Hootie & the Blowfish

1996
March 30: "Because You Loved Me" - Celine Dion
April 6: "Because You Loved Me" - Celine Dion
April 13: "Because You Loved Me" - Celine Dion
April 20: "Because You Loved Me" - Celine Dion
April 27: "Because You Loved Me" - Celine Dion
May 4: "Because You Loved Me" - Celine Dion
May 11: "Because You Loved Me" - Celine Dion
May 18: "Always Be My Baby" - Mariah Carey
July 13: "Give Me One Reason" – Tracy Chapman
July 20: "Give Me One Reason" – Tracy Chapman
July 27: "Give Me One Reason" – Tracy Chapman
October 26: "It's All Coming Back to Me Now" - Celine Dion
Video of the Year: "Ironic" – Alanis Morissette

1997

1998

1999

2000

2001

2002

2003

2004

2005

2006

2007

2008

2009

2010

2011

2012

2013

2014

2015

Note: No song of the year 2015 was named due to the show's abrupt cancellation.

List of hosts
Since the show's first introduction in 1994, it has featured a number of hosts:
A.J. Hammer (1995–98)
Madison Michelle (1998–2000)
Cane (2000–01)
Rachel Perry (2002–06)
Abby Gennet (2003)
Bradford How (2004–06)
Matt Pinfield (2006)
Aamer Haleem (2001–06, 2006–07)
Alison Becker (2007–08)
Jim Shearer (2009–14)
Shannon Coffey (2015)

Records
Artist with most weeks at #1 – Daughtry (39 weeks)
Video with most weeks at #1 –  "Smooth" - Santana featuring Rob Thomas and "Not Ready to Make Nice" – The Dixie Chicks (14 weeks)
Most consecutive #1 video – "Not Ready to Make Nice" – The Dixie Chicks (13 weeks)
Artist with most songs in the 20x20 Club – Lifehouse ("You and Me", "Whatever It Takes", "Hanging By A Moment" and "Halfway Gone")
Song with the most weeks in the countdown – "Iris" – Goo Goo Dolls (35 weeks)
Longest number of weeks to reach #1 – "Ho Hey" – The Lumineers (25 weeks)

Artists with the most #1 videos

See also
VH1
Total Request Live
MTV

References

External links
 The 20
 VH1
 
 Top 20 Countdown on Fuse
  For the Halfway Gone controversy

VH1 original programming
American music chart television shows
1994 American television series debuts
1990s American music television series
2000s American music television series
2010s American music television series
2015 American television series endings